William Tiler (fl. 1406–1407), of Leominster, Herefordshire, was an English politician.

He was a Member (MP) of the Parliament of England for Leominster in 1406 and 1407.

References

14th-century births
15th-century deaths
14th-century English people
English MPs 1406
People from Leominster
English MPs 1407